South Hedland or Port Hedland City Centre is a suburb of the Town of Port Hedland, in the Pilbara region in north-western Western Australia. It is the CBD of the Town of Port Hedland and is the Port Hedland Town Centre. It can be reached by the North West Coastal Highway and Great Northern Highway. It contains Hedland Senior High School.

History
The Commonwealth Government's 1960 decision to lift an embargo on iron ore exports led to the rapid expansion of mining in the Pilbara and the creation of several new towns, including South Hedland.

The original design of the South Hedland townsite was inspired by the Radburn principles. Four residential neighbourhoods where to cluster around a commercial core connected by parkways and pedestrian connections. Following the completion of the first neighbourhood the design was considered a failure by residents and government authorities and abandoned in 1974, although it has continued to shape the overall town layout to the present day.

References

Mining towns in Western Australia
Port Hedland, Western Australia
Towns in Western Australia